
The Jane Mansbridge bibliography includes books, book chapters and journal articles by Jane Mansbridge, the Charles F. Adams Professor of Political Leadership and Democratic Values, Kennedy School of Government, Harvard University.

Books

Chapters in books 
1975 - 1979
 
 
 
 
 

1980 - 1989
 
 
 
 

1990 - 1994
 
 
 
  Reprinted in 
 
 
 
 
 
 
 
 
 

1995 - 1999
 
 
 
 
 
 
 
 
  and in 
 
 
 
  translated as 
 
 

2000 - 2004
 
 
 
 
 
 
 
 

2005 - 2009
 
 
 
 
 
 

2010 onwards

Journal articles 
1973 - 1979
 
 
  Massachusetts review archive
 

1980 - 1989
  
  
  
 
  
 

1990 - 1999
  
  
  
  and also in *  
  
 
  
 
 

2000 - 2009
  
  
  
  Pdf.
  Pdf.
  Pdf.
  
  
  
 
  Spanish translation of: 
  PDF version.
  
  
 

2010 onwards
  
 
 

Mansbridge, Jane
Mansbridge, Jane